The Women's CIMB Kuala Lumpur Open Squash Championships 2013 is the women's edition of the 2013 Kuala Lumpur Open Squash Championships, which is a tournament of the WSA World Series event Gold (prize money: 70 000 $). The event took place in Kuala Lumpur in Malaysia from 27 March to 31 March. Laura Massaro won her first CIMB Kuala Lumpur Open trophy, beating Alison Waters in the final.

Prize money and ranking points
For 2013, the prize purse was $70,000. The prize money and points breakdown is as follows:

Seeds

Draw and results

See also
Men's Kuala Lumpur Open Squash Championships 2013
WSA World Series 2013
Kuala Lumpur Open Squash Championships

References

External links
WSA CIMB Kuala Lumpur Open 2013 website
Kuala Lumpur Open 2013 official website
CIMB Kuala Lumpur Nicol David Open 2013 Squashsite website

Squash tournaments in Malaysia
Kuala Lumpur Open Squash Championships
2013 in Malaysian women's sport
2010s in Kuala Lumpur
Sport in Kuala Lumpur
2013 in women's squash